The Beginning of the Legend is a 1976 Soviet drama film directed by Boris Grigoryev.

Plot 
The film tells about the childhood of Yuri Gagarin, which took place against the backdrop of war, occupation, famine, the expulsion of the elder brother and sister to Germany, the expulsion of the Nazis from the Smolensk region and the transfer of his family to Gzhatsk.

Cast 
 Larisa Luzhina as Anna Timofeyevna Gagarina
 Georgiy Burkov as Aleksei Ivanovich Gagarin
 Oleg Orlov as Yuri Alekseievich Gagarin
 Svetlana Ponomaryova as Nastya (as Sveta Ponomaryova)
 Mayya Bulgakova as Ksenia Gerasimovna
 Vilnis Bekeris as Albert
 Boris Grigorev as Dronov
 Vera Altayskaya
 Yury Grigorev
 Vladimir Gusev as Pilot

References

External links 
 

1976 films
1970s Russian-language films
Soviet drama films
1976 drama films